Andreas Rædergård Schjelderup (born 1 June 2004) is a Norwegian professional footballer who plays as a winger or an attacking midfielder for Primeira Liga club Benfica.

Club career

Early years
Born in Bodø, Norway, Schjelderup began his career in the youth sector at Bodø/Glimt. Schjelderup was coveted by many big clubs throughout Europe, including reported interest from clubs in top leagues in Italy, Spain, and the Netherlands.

Nordsjælland
In July 2020, Schjelderup chose to move to Denmark to sign with Superliga club Nordsjælland. He was promoted to the Nordsjælland first team following the winter break during the 2020–21 season. He made his senior debut from the starting eleven, in a 2–0 defeat to OB on 7 February 2021. Aged 16 years and 248 days old, he became the 13th youngest player in Superliga history. He scored his first senior goal for the club in a 3–0 win over local rivals Lyngby on 12 March. In doing so, he became the club's record youngest goalscorer in Superliga history, edging out teammate Tochi Chukwuani's record set the previous season, and the fourth youngest overall in league history. On 21 March, the final day of the 2020–21 Danish Superliga regular season, Schjelderup scored both goals in Nordsjælland's 2–1 defeat of SønderjyskE, leapfrogging his club above SønderjyskE and into sixth place, securing the final spot in the Superliga championship play-offs.

Benfica
On 12 January 2023, Schjelderup signed a five-year contract with Primeira Liga side Benfica. The fee reported by Portuguese media was around €14 million. Norwegian media reported, however, that the fee was 105 million kroner (approximately €10 million), and Nordsjælland also secured 20% of a potential future sale.

International career
Schjelderup has been capped at youth level for Norway.

Style of play
Schjelderup is regarded as a highly skillful and technical player capable of playing in several offensive positions, due to his versatility; throughout his career, he has been deployed as a striker, as a second striker, or even as a winger, although his primary position is that of an attacking midfielder. Playing primarily as a left winger, Schjelderup tends to hug the touchline off the ball. He receives possession from teammates out wide before cutting inside and driving towards more central areas, thus ensuring that he can pick up the ball with space and time before looking to make a real impact. Schjelderup also has the ability to draw defenders toward him. That opens up space for his teammates to exploit. Another aspect of his game is his dribbling, Schjelderup has extremely quick feet and excellent agility in one-on-one duels. When making attacking runs off the ball, Schjelderup’s main objective is to create lateral separation. He very rarely tries to make runs in behind, and instead prefers to make runs out wide and receive in front of the defence. Schjelderup idolises Norwegians Martin Ødegaard and Erling Haaland, being compared to the latter due to his goalscoring abilities.

Career statistics

References

External links
 Profile at the S.L. Benfica website
 

2004 births
Living people
People from Bodø
Norwegian footballers
Norwegian expatriate footballers
Association football defenders
Norway under-21 international footballers
Norway youth international footballers
Danish Superliga players
Primeira Liga players
Liga Portugal 2 players
FC Nordsjælland players
S.L. Benfica footballers
S.L. Benfica B players
Norwegian expatriate sportspeople in Denmark
Norwegian expatriate sportspeople in Portugal
Expatriate men's footballers in Denmark
Expatriate footballers in Portugal